Benzyltrimethylammonium hydroxide, also known as Triton B or trimethylbenzylammonium hydroxide, is a quaternary ammonium salt that functions as an organic base.  It is usually handled as a solution in water or methanol.  The compound is colourless, although the solutions often appear yellowish.  Commercial samples often have a distinctive fish-like odour, presumably due to the presence of trimethylamine via hydrolysis.

Uses
Together with the benzyltriethylammonium salt, benzyltrimethylammonium hydroxide is a popular phase-transfer catalyst.

It is used in aldol condensation reactions and base-catalyzed dehydration reactions. It is also used as a base in Ando's Z-selective variant of  Horner-Wadsworth-Emmons Olefination reactions.

Relative to tetramethylammonium hydroxide, benzyltriethylammonium hydroxide is more labile. In 6M NaOH at 160 °C their halflives are 61.9 and 4 h, respectively.

References

See also
 http://www.chemcas.com/AnalyticalDetail.asp?pidx=1&id=19594&cas=100-85-6&page=490

Hydroxides
Quaternary ammonium compounds
Reagents for organic chemistry
Benzyl compounds